Body Team 12 is a 2015 short-documentary film about the Red Cross workers of Liberia, who collected dead bodies during the height of the Ebola outbreak in West Africa. The story is told by Garmai Sumo, a female worker who served as a nurse during the epidemic. It is directed by David Darg and produced by Darg and Bryn Mooser, while Olivia Wilde and Paul Allen of Vulcan Productions are executive producers.

The documentary was well received by critics and earned widespread critical acclaim. It won the Best Documentary Short award at the 2015  Tribeca Film Festival. Body Team 12 is nominated for the Documentary Short Subject category at the 88th Academy Awards.

Synopsis 
Garmai Sumo is the only female member of Body Team 12, a group of medical professionals who handle the bodies of the victims of Ebola in Liberia. The film focuses on Sumo's perspective of the crisis in her country.

Reception
The film won a Best Documentary award at the 2015 Tribeca Film Festival. The jury explained, "The winning film is a spiritual and inspiring story of personal courage and commitment. The filmmaking team takes us on a fearless journey that restores our faith in humanity and inspires viewers to be optimistic despite facing the most extreme challenges."

Awards
 2016: Academy Awards  Best Documentary Short Subject - Nominated
 2015: Tribeca Film Festival  Best Documentary Short
 2017: News & Documentary Emmy Awards  Outstanding Short Documentary - Winner

References

External links
 Body Team 12 at the Vulcan Productions
 Body Team 12 at the Tribeca Film 
 Body Team 12 at the RYOT Films 
 Body Team 12 on HBO
 

2015 films
2015 short documentary films
American short documentary films
Documentary films about health care
Documentary films about Africa
West African Ebola virus epidemic
Films shot in Liberia
Vulcan Productions films
Films about viral outbreaks
2010s English-language films
2010s American films